This is a list of diplomatic missions of Monaco. The Principality of Monaco, despite its small size, is a full member of the United Nations, and has its own embassies abroad, including 114 honorary consulates (not mentioned below) .

America

 Washington, D.C. (Embassy)
 New York City (Consulate-General)

Europe

 Brussels (Embassy)

 Paris (Embassy)

 Berlin (Embassy)

 Rome (Embassy)

 Rome (Embassy)

 Lisbon (Embassy)

 Madrid (Embassy)

 Bern (Embassy)

 London (Embassy)

Gallery

Multilateral organisations
 Brussels (permanent representation to the European Union)
 New York City (permanent representation to the United Nations)
 Paris (permanent representations to UNESCO and Francophonie)
 Vienna (permanent representations to the United Nations and the Organization for Security and Co-operation in Europe)

See also
Foreign relations of Monaco

Notes

References
 Ministry of External Relations of the Principality of Monaco

Monaco

Monaco diplomacy-related lists